The New Zealand men's under-23 softball team represents New Zealand in international under-23 softball. The team is administrated by Softball New Zealand.

The team played will play their first official matches at the 2023 U-23 Men's Softball World Cup where they have been grouped with Canada, Japan, Venezuela, Guatemala and Israel.

History
Prior to the U-23 Men's Softball World Cup being introduced, the Major Sox had played friendlies and been on tour to Indonesia and Canada among other.

The inaugural U-23 Men's Softball World Cup was scheduled to take place in October 2022, but was postponed due to a number of reasons. As one of the 2 men's softball sides in Oceania New Zealand qualified along with Australia.

Results and fixtures
The following is a list of match results in the last 12 months, as well as any future matches that have been scheduled.

2023

Players

Current squad
The following 16 players were called up for the 2023 U-23 Men's Softball World Cup.

Brock Attewell
Oscar Clark
Te Kirika Cooper-Nicola
Damon Creasy
Huw Davies
Max Earley
Brock Evans
Seth Gibson
Xaviar Herrick
Josh Lubiejewski
Tobias Makisi
Floyd Nola
Liam Potts
Kaleb Rona
Taine Slaughter
Caleb Stewart

References

Softball U-23
Softball in New Zealand
Men's junior national softball teams
Men's sport in New Zealand
Youth sport in New Zealand